Rigord (Rigordus) ( 1150 – c. 1209) was a French chronicler. He was probably born near Alais in Languedoc, and became a physician.

After becoming a monk he entered the monastery of Argenteuil, and then that of Saint-Denis, and described himself as "regis Francorum chronographus".

Rigord wrote the Gesta Philippi Augusti, dealing with the life of the French king, Philip Augustus, from his coronation in 1179 until 1206. The work, which is very valuable, was abridged and continued by William the Breton. The earlier part of the Gesta speaks of the king in very laudatory terms, but in the latter part it is much less flattering in its tone.

The Gesta is published in tome xvii of Dom Martin Bouquet's Recueil des historiens des Gaules et de la France (Paris, 1738–1876); and with introduction by HF Delaborde (Paris, 1882–85). A French translation of the Gesta is in tome xi of Guizot's Collection des mémoires relatifs à l'histoire de France (Paris, 1825). Rigord also wrote a short chronicle of the kings of France.

References

See August Potthast, Bibliotheca historica (Berlin, 1896); and Auguste Molinier, Les Sources de l'histoire de France, tome iii. (Paris, 1903).
A partial English translation by Paul Hyams is available http://falcon.arts.cornell.edu/prh3/408/texts/Rigindex.html

External links
 

1150s births
1209 deaths
People from Alès
French chroniclers
12th-century French historians
13th-century French historians
French male non-fiction writers
13th-century Latin writers